Maria is a 1975 Swedish drama film directed by Mats Arehn. Lis Nilheim won the award for Best Actress at the 11th Guldbagge Awards.

Cast
 Eddie Axberg as Arrested Youth
 Olof Bergström as Probation Officer
 Janne Carlsson as Rikard
 Viveca Dahlén as Sylvia
 Siv Ericks as Woman at the Hairdresser
 Karl Erik Flens as Maria's Father
 Palle Granditsky as Plainclothes Policeman
 Inga Grönlund as Wife of Probation Officer
 Ulf Hasseltorp as Magnus Widen
 Sten Johan Hedman as Convict in the Fight (as Sten Hedman)
 Thomas Hellberg as Leif Johansson
 Steve Jansson as Teacher
 Ove Kant as Jailer
 Jan Kreigsman as Policeman
 Olle Leth as Plainclothes Policeman
 Lars Lundgren as Jailer (as Lasse Lundgren)
 Peter Malmsjö as Kenta
 Lis Nilheim as Maria Widen

References

External links
 
 

1975 films
1975 drama films
Swedish drama films
1970s Swedish-language films
Films directed by Mats Arehn
1970s Swedish films